Lightbend, formerly known as Typesafe, is a company founded by Martin Odersky, the creator of the Scala programming language, Jonas Bonér, the creator of the Akka middleware, and Paul Phillips in 2011.

It provides a platform for building reactive applications for the JVM, consisting of the Play Framework, Akka middleware and Scala programming language, with additional supporting products and development tools such as the Slick database library for Scala and the sbt build tool. Lightbend also provides training, consulting and commercial support on the platform.

Lightbend is one of the main contributors of Reactive Streams.

In February 2016, the company was renamed from Typesafe to Lightbend and adopted a new logo.

Leadership
The company's CEO is Jonas Bonér.

Investors
Lightbend initially raised $3 million for Series A funding from Greylock Partners. Lightbend then raised another $14 million for Series B from Shasta Ventures, Greylock Partners, Juniper Networks and Francois Stieger.  Intel Capital is leading a new $20 million Series C round of funding along with new investor Blue Cloud Ventures and current backers Bain Capital Ventures, Polytech Ecosystem Ventures, and Shasta Ventures.  This brings funding to date to $42 million.

Products
Lightbend leads the following open-source or source-available software projects: 
Scala programming language
Akka event-driven middleware
Play Framework web framework
Lagom reactive microservices framework
Slick database query and access library for Scala
sbt build tool

Lightbend also offers Lightbend Subscription, which offers 24/7 developer support and a commercial product Lightbend Production Suite. 
Lightbend Production Suite includes service orchestration, Lightbend Monitoring, application resilience, and enhanced availability.

Conferences
Lightbend hosts an annual conference called Scala Days which brings together developers from around the world to share their experiences and new ideas around creating applications with Scala.

Educational Resources 
Lightbend offers an educational platform called Lightbend Academy, which includes online courses for subscription customers.

References

External links

Software companies of the United States
Companies established in 2011
Middleware